Juliette Sméralda is a French Afro-descendant sociologist.

Publications 
 L'Indo-Antillais entre Noirs et Békés, Éditions L'Harmattan (2008)
 La société martiniquaise entre ethnicité et citoyenneté, Éditions L'Harmattan (2008)
 Du cheveu défrisé au cheveu crépu, Éditions Publibook, Paris, 2012. 
 Peau noire cheveu crépu, l'histoire d'une aliénation, Éditions Jasor (2005) 
 La racisation des relations intergroupes ou la problématique de la couleur. Le cas de la Martinique, Éditions L'Harmattan (2002)
 La question de l’immigration indienne dans son environnement socio-économique martiniquais : 1848-1900, Éditions L'Harmattan (1996)
 Guadeloupe Martinique, des sociétés en révolte. Morphologie d'un conflit social. Kéditions, mars 2009. 
 Philibert Duféal, militant communiste et syndicaliste martiniquais, L'Harmattan, 2012. 
 Socio Logiques, Publibook, 2011.
 28 jours à la dérive. L'épopée d'Irmin et Claude Pallud en mer caraïbe, octobre 1990, Éditions Exbrayat, Martinique, 2013.
 La poupée d'Isis, janvier 2012 (auto-édité).
 Le trempage. Une trouvaille culinaire martiniquaise, 2013 (auto-édité).

References

External links 
 Interview de Juliette Sméralda à l’occasion du Salon Boucle d’ébène, à Paris (Juin 2006)
 Brève histoire de l’esthétique capillaire africaine de Mounza Shabaka (Septembre 2006)
 Interview de Juliette Sméralda sur son ouvrage "La Question de l'immigration indienne" (2004)
 Vidéo de l'émission BWorld Connection consacrée à l'ouvrage Peau noire Cheveu Crépu
 Interview de Juliette Sméralda, dossier "Le marché des cosmétiques ethniques" (2007) 
 Vidéo de Juliette Sméralda sur la question de la violence en Martinique (novembre 2010) 
 Article de Juliette Sméralda sur notre rapport au sucre (octobre 2011)'' 

French sociologists
French women sociologists
Year of birth missing (living people)
Living people